Sinikka Laine-Törmänen (born 17 October 1945) is a Finnish author primarily of young adult fiction. Her first novel Ohari was published in 1982.

Laine has won many literary awards and her novel Tyttö tuulesta, poika pimeästä (1986) won the Finnish state literature award.

Laine was born in Riihimäki, but lives and works in Oulu. She is married to artist Veikko Törmänen.

Works

Novels
 Ohari, WSOY 1982. 
 Ei kenenkään, ei koskaan, WSOY 1984. 
 Tyttö tuulesta, poika pimeästä, WSOY 1986. 
Silkkiuikku, WSOY 1988 (as Danish translation: Sommerpigen, 1990) 
 Sininen ruoho, WSOY 1990, 
Jos et pelkää pimeää, WSOY 1991. 
Töyhtö, WSOY 1992. 
Myrtti, yhden talven tyttö, WSOY 1994. 
Kuujuhla, WSOY 1995. 
Hyvästi, valkoinen, WSOY 1996.

Short stories
Sata munkkipossua in Sanojen portille lyhyesti (Edited by Asko Martinheimo), WSOY 1986
Taiteilijaelämää, Kaltio 4 / 2003

References

1945 births
Living people
People from Riihimäki
Finnish women novelists
20th-century Finnish novelists
Finnish-language writers
Finnish children's writers
Writers from Kanta-Häme
Finnish women children's writers
20th-century women writers